Voshteh (also Romanized as Veshteh) is a village in Rudbar-e Mohammad-e Zamani Rural District, Alamut-e Gharbi District, Qazvin County, Qazvin Province, Iran. At the 2006 census, its population was 386, in 129 families.

References 

Populated places in Qazvin County